Newington railway station is on the Chatham Main Line in England, serving the village of Newington, Kent.

The station and all trains that call are operated by Southeastern.

History
A station on that line at Newington was opened by the LCDR on 1 August 1862.

Facilities
The outermost two tracks are designated the "loop" lines, and the innermost two are the "main" lines. At Newington, there are two platforms, one on each of the "loop" lines; these are capable of accepting 12 car trains.

Services

All services at Newington are operated by Southeastern using  EMUs.

The typical off-peak service in trains per hour is:
 1 tph to 
 1 tph to  via 

References

External links

Railway stations in Swale
DfT Category E stations
Former London, Chatham and Dover Railway stations
Railway stations in Great Britain opened in 1862
Railway stations served by Southeastern
1862 establishments in England